The 39th Vehbi Emre & Hamit Kaplan Tournament 2022 was a wrestling event held in Istanbul, Turkey, from 24 February to 27 February 2022. It was held as the first of the ranking series together with the 2022 Yasar Dogu Tournament. The event aired freely on the United World Wrestling.

This international tournament includes competition men's Greco-Roman wrestling. This ranking tournament was held in honor of the Olympic Champion, Hamit Kaplan and  Turkish Wrestler and manager Vehbi Emre.

Competition schedule
All times are (UTC+3)

Medal table

Team ranking

Medal overview

Men's Greco-Roman

Results

Men's Greco-Roman 55 kg
 Legend
 F — Won by fall

Elimination groups

Group A
{|
|

Group B
{|
|

Knockout round

Men's Greco-Roman 60 kg
 Legend
 F — Won by fall
R — Retired
WO — Won by walkover

Men's Greco-Roman 63 kg
 Legend
 F — Won by fall
WO — Won by walkover
C — Won by 3 cautions given to the opponent

Men's Greco-Roman 67 kg
 Legend
 F — Won by fall

Men's Greco-Roman 72 kg
 Legend
 F — Won by fall

Men's Greco-Roman 77 kg
 Legend
 F — Won by fall
WO — Won by walkover

Men's Greco-Roman 82 kg
 Legend
 F — Won by fall

Men's Greco-Roman 87 kg
 Legend
 F — Won by fall

Men's Greco-Roman 97 kg
 Legend
 F — Won by fall
WO — Won by walkover

Top half

Bottom half

Men's Greco-Roman 130 kg
 Legend
 F — Won by fall

Participating nations
123 competitors from 16 nations participated.

 (1)
 (12)
 (3)
 (4)
 (1)
 (9)
 (2)
 (28)
 (4)
 (6)
 (3)
 (2)
 (5)
 (3)
 (30)
 (10)

Ranking Series
Ranking Series Calendar 2022:
 1st Ranking Series: 24-27 February, Turkey, Istanbul ⇒ 2022 Yasar Dogu Tournament2022 Vehbi Emre & Hamit Kaplan Tournament
 2nd Ranking Series: 2-5 June, Kazakhstan, Almaty ⇒ 2022 Bolat Turlykhanov Cup
 3rd Ranking Series: 22-25 June, Italy, Rome ⇒ Matteo Pellicone Ranking Series 2022
 4th Ranking Series: 14-17 July, Tunisia, Tunis ⇒ 2022 Tunis Ranking Series

References 

Vehbi Emre and Hamit Kaplan Tournament
Vehbi Emre and Hamit Kaplan Tournament
Sports competitions in Istanbul
Vehbi Emre and Hamit Kaplan Tournament
2022 Vehbi Emre & Hamit Kaplan Tournament
International wrestling competitions hosted by Turkey
Vehbi Emre & Hamit Kaplan Tournament